Love Bipolar (Love Bipolar – Love ) is a 2018 Thai television series starring Toni Rakkaen and Laila Boonyasak (Ploy).

Produced by GMMTV together with On & On Infinity, the series was one of the ten television series for 2018 showcased by GMMTV in their "Series X" event on 1 February 2018. It premiered on GMM 25 and LINE TV on 18 March 2018, airing on Sundays at 20:30 ICT and 22:30 ICT, respectively. The series concluded on 8 April 2018.

Cast and characters 
Below are the cast of the series:

Main 
 Toni Rakkaen as Sang Nuea / Sang Tai
 Chermarn Boonyasak (Ploy) as Wenny

Supporting 
 Carissa Springett as Arin
 Penpak Sirikul (Tai) as Yupin
 Chatchawit Techarukpong (Victor) as Kanit 
 Thanaboon Wanlopsirinun (Na) as Khun Phol
 Tatchakorn Boonlapayanan (Godji) as Tuktik

Soundtrack

References

External links 
 Love Bipolar on LINE TV
 GMMTV

Television series by GMMTV
Thai romantic comedy television series
Thai drama television series
2018 Thai television series debuts
2018 Thai television series endings
GMM 25 original programming